Peyton Roi List (born April 6, 1998) is an American actress and model. List began her career as a child model, modeling for tween magazines and companies, before transitioning to child actress. She made her acting debut with the film 27 Dresses (2008), and soon became recognized for playing Holly Hills in the Diary of a Wimpy Kid film series (2011–2012).

List rose to international attention for portraying Emma on the Disney Channel series Jessie (2011–2015), a role which she reprised in the spinoff series Bunk'd (2015–2018, 2021). She has since portrayed Laina Michaels in the YouTube Premium films The Thinning (2016) and The Thinning: New World Order (2018), Olivia Richmond on the Hulu web series Light as a Feather (2018), and Tory Nichols in the Netflix (previously YouTube Premium) series Cobra Kai (2019–present).

List's other works in film include starring in Remember Me (2010), The Sorcerer's Apprentice (2010), Bereavement (2010), Something Borrowed (2011), The Seventh Dwarf (2014), The Outcasts (2017), Valley Girl (2020) and Paper Spiders (2020). List has also appeared in the television films Secrets in the Walls (2010) and The Swap (2016).

Early life
List was born April 6, 1998. She has two brothers, her twin Spencer, and a younger brother, Phoenix, both of whom are actors.

She attended The Carroll School (P.S. 58) for elementary school, and the New Voices School for Academic and Creative Arts (M.S. 443) for middle school, both in New York City. She attended Oak Park High School in Oak Park, California, where she graduated in 2016. During her early childhood, List also trained as a dancer, studying ballet, jazz, tap, and hip-hop until she was in sixth grade.

Career

2002–2008: Early roles and debut

List first began her career as a child model, and in 2009 appeared on the cover of the American Girls 2009 Back to School issue. In 2011, she modeled for Justice magazine. She had also appeared in over four hundred advertisements in various formats for various companies. She began acting with television and film appearances. She made an uncredited appearance on the soap opera As the World Turns in 2002. In 2004, she appeared on the television show All My Children as Bess, and in the same year made a cameo appearance in the feature film Spider-Man 2, which went uncredited. In 2008, she appeared in the feature film 27 Dresses, starring as the young version of the character Jane Nichols. The film was a commercial success, and served as her acting debut.

2010–2015: Breakthrough with Disney and films
List began to appear in more feature films, and in 2010 was cast alongside Robert Pattinson in the film Remember Me as Samantha, a girl who bullies Pattinson's character's younger sister. The film was a box-office success. In the same year, List had begun her work with Disney, and appeared as the younger version of Becky in the fantasy film The Sorcerer's Apprentice, which turned to be a financial failure. She also was cast in the Lifetime television film Secrets in the Walls, and played Wendy Miller in the crime horror film Bereavement, which was a box-office success. In 2011, List starred as Holly Hills, the crush of Greg Heffley, in the comedy film Diary of a Wimpy Kid: Rodrick Rules, the second installment of the Diary of a Wimpy Kid film series. The film performed well commercially, and List later reprised her role for its sequel, Diary of a Wimpy Kid: Dog Days. The film was a success alike to its prequels, and the acting ensemble, including List, had won a Young Artist Award.

List next had a role in the romantic comedy film Something Borrowed in 2011, which was received negatively. Also in 2011, List began her work on Disney Channel, and was cast as Emma Ross, the eldest of four affluent children, on the Disney Channel series Jessie alongside Debby Ryan and her Diary of a Wimpy Kid co-star Karan Brar. The show attained millions of viewers on average per episode, and soon became List's biggest role at the time. The show ran for four seasons, and ended on February 25, 2015. At the same time, it was announced that List, along with Brar and Skai Jackson, would reprise their roles in the spinoff series Bunk'd. The show began airing in 2015. Along with reprising the role on Bunk'd, she also had appeared as Emma Ross on other Disney Channel shows, such as Austin & Ally and I Didn't Do It. Along with her television work, List continued her work in films. In 2012, she appeared in the drama film The Trouble with Cali, which was received negatively. From 2013 to 2014, she co-hosted the Disney Channel program Pass the Plate, a segment focusing on healthy eating, with Karan Brar. In 2014, she voiced Princess Rose in the English dub of the German animated film The Seventh Dwarf. Though the film was a moderate financial success, it was received unfavorably by critics. In 2015, List performed with Ingrid Michaelson at one of Michaelson's concerts.

2016–present
In 2016, List co-starred along with Jacob Bertrand in the Disney Channel Original Movie The Swap, appearing as Ellie O'Brien. The premiere averaged over two million viewers, and had a mixed reception. In the same year, she appeared as Laina Michaels in the YouTube Premium film The Thinning, starring alongside Logan Paul and Lia Marie Johnson. In 2017, List appeared in the teen comedy film The Outcasts as Mackenzie Smith. Production had initially began in 2014 under its original title The Outskirts, and was not released until three years later. It was originally released direct-to-video, but was eventually picked up for a theatrical release. In 2018, it was announced that List would leave Bunk'd, and depart from her work on Disney Channel entirely. When she still worked with the network, she was an active member of the Disney Channel Circle of Stars.

List reprised her role as Laina Michaels in The Thinning: New World Order, the sequel to The Thinning, which was released in 2018. In the same year, she starred alongside Asa Butterfield in the romantic drama film Then Came You as Ashley. List was soon cast in the main role of Olivia Richmond in the first season of the supernatural web series Light as a Feather, which was released through Hulu in October 2018. Also in 2018, she made her singing debut with the single "Liar Liar". In 2019, List voiced Barbara Gordon / Batgirl in the direct-to-video superhero film Batman: Hush. In the same year, she was cast in the recurring role of Tory in the YouTube Premium action series Cobra Kai, which she played throughout the second, third, fourth and fifth seasons. In 2020, List appeared in the musical film Valley Girl, a remake of the 1983 film, had a role in the Netflix comedy-horror film Hubie Halloween, and co-starred in the drama film Paper Spiders opposite Stefania LaVie Owen and Lili Taylor.

In June 2022, List was cast in the lead role in the upcoming Paramount+ television series with the working title School Spirits.

Namefellow
List shares the same name with a fellow actress, Peyton List (born 1986). The younger List was interviewed by Access Hollywood, saying she uses Peyton R. List''' to avoid confusion. Union SAG-AFTRA's policy avoids living actors with the same name; this instance went unnoticed. They appeared in the same scene—when the older List starred on As the World Turns as Lucy Montgomery. Years later, the younger List cited confusion when they stayed at the same hotel—they received daily call sheets and voicemails for each other. IndieWire noted the confusion appeared on the website Wikipedia, where both actresses' articles started out with exactly the same introduction text of: "Peyton List is an American actress and model." Both actresses also voiced characters in the animated movie Batman: Hush, the younger as Batgirl and the older as Poison Ivy.

Filmography
Film

Television

Video game
 Cobra Kai 2: Dojos Rising'' (2022) as Tory Nichols (voice role)

Music videos
 "Only You" (2018), by Cheat Codes and Little Mix

Awards and nominations

References

External links

 
 

1998 births
Living people
21st-century American actresses
Actresses from Florida
Actresses from New York City
American child actresses
American child models
American female models
American film actresses
American television actresses
American twins
American voice actresses
Female models from Florida
Female models from New York (state)
Fraternal twin actresses
Models from New York City